Veeraraghavan is a surname. Notable people with the surname include:

Avinash Veeraraghavan (born 1975), Indian artist
Natteri Veeraraghavan (1913–2004), Indian physician, microbiologist, and medical researcher
P. S. Veeraraghavan (born 1948), Indian scientist and aerospace engineer

Indian surnames